Rancho Chávez Airstrip is a private dirt airstrip located 7 km West of Mulegé, in the  Municipality of Mulegé, Baja California Sur, Mexico.

The airstrip is used solely for general aviation, and may be temporarily closed. The MLG2 code was used as identifier.

External links
 Baja Bush Pilots Forums about Mulegé airstrips.

Airports in Baja California Sur
Mulegé Municipality